Rookwood School is an independent day and boarding school for children aged 2 to 18, located on a campus off Weyhill Road in Andover, Hampshire, England.

History
The school was founded in 1934 as a girls' school and moved to its current site in 1946. Boys were admitted to the Senior school in 2003.

Heads
2017–present Mr A Kirk-Burgess

2016 - 2017 Dr M Whalley

2015/16 Winter term Mr David Bown (acting)

2010-2015 Mrs Louise Whetstone

2000-2010 Mrs Margaret Langley

Previous Headmistresses: Mrs Shelia Hindle, Miss Kathleen Tanner

Organisation
The school has two departments: the Lower School consisting of (Pre-School, Pre-Preparatory and Prep School) and Senior School.

Academics
Rookwood School will open a new Sixth Form in September 2021. Students who have left the school are known as 'Old Daddys'.

Boarding
Although most of its pupils are day pupils Rookwood has boarding provisions for a small number of boarders. There are two boarding houses: Beechwood (girls) and Oakwood (boys).

References

External links
School Website
Profile on the ISC website
ISI Inspection Reports 

Andover, Hampshire
Educational institutions established in 1934
Private schools in Hampshire
1934 establishments in England
Boarding schools in Hampshire
Member schools of the Independent Schools Association (UK)